Either You're In or You're In The Way (2009) is a memoir written by Logan and Noah Millers.  It was a San Francisco Chronicle non-fiction weekly bestseller in 2009. Logan and Noah Miller were featured on FORA.tv's Filmmaking on the Fly: Logan & Noah Miller.

References

External links
 Harpercollinsspeakersbureau.com

2009 non-fiction books
HarperCollins books
American memoirs